Kotórz Mały  is a village in the administrative district of Gmina Turawa, within Opole County, Opole Voivodeship, in south-western Poland.

The village has a population of 930.

References

Villages in Opole County